Oak regeneration failure is phenomenon where there are not sufficient seedling- and sapling-sized oak (Quercus spp.) trees to replace mature oaks when they die. This causes oaks, traditionally an important species in many temperate forests, to decline in population while other trees, such as maples, become more prominent. Oak regeneration failure has been observed across Eastern and Midwestern forests in the United States, and has been noted in Europe as well. Some estimate that as few as 4% of oak-dominated forests in the Eastern U.S. have sufficient oaks to replace the current canopy.

Causes of oak regeneration failure include climate change, introduced pests and pathogens, and changes in disturbance regimes and fire use, which affect the canopy gaps that are important to oak maturation. Because oak has long been valued as a timber for use in construction, furniture-making, and shipbuilding, there is a history of efforts to proactively manage oak growth that dates back to 13th century France. Modern efforts are focused on sustaining pre-modern conditions through such tactics as reintroducing fire to forests that were previously under natural or indigenous fire regimes and creating deer exclusion zones to reduce the intensity of browsing. Scientists are also studying how climate change will impact the regeneration of oaks. Some models suggest that oaks will rise in prominence as warming temperatures make territory more hospitable to them and less hospitable to other species, but changes in temperature and precipitation patterns are also likely to have adverse effects on oaks, particularly young trees.

History 
French ordinances from the 13th century mandated the planting of oak seedlings to ensure that harvesting did not outstripe production, early evidence of challenges to oak regeneration. This special care was due to oak's high timber value and versatile uses. Great Britain imported oak from colonial America to compensate for the scarcity of it in Britain. One of the first government-sponsored pieces of forestry research in America was to promote the growth of live oak (Quercus virginiana), which was used for shipbuilding.

Oak continued to be an important lumber even after wooden ships became obsolete, and concerns about its regeneration continued as forestry developed. Throughout the early 1900s, researchers studied forests throughout the American midwest and south, finding that, after clearcutting a forest lot, oaks were able to maintain primacy in the next generation if there was significant advance regeneration or disturbance from fire, but declined in many other cases.

Beginning in the early 1900s, when a non-native powdery mildew pathogen was introduced to European forests, concerns began about the regenerative failure of the widespread native Pedunculate oak (Quercus robur). This mildew infects sapling oaks and leads to increased mortality.

Causes 
Young oak is very sensitive to light conditions, which are governed in forests by gaps in the canopy. In unmanaged stands and under historical indigenous management, fire was a primary agent of creating sizable canopy gaps, enabling the recruitment of oaks into the mature canopy. However, modern forest management often entails fire exclusion, leading to smaller canopy gaps and less capacity for oaks to get the needed light. Naturally, oaks also rely on the production and dispersal of acorns for regeneration. In the wake of extensive logging, many forests in the United States have simplified and homogenous stand compositions compared to natural stands. Because acorn production declines with age, this may lead to a decrease in acorn dispersal, endangering the next generation of oaks.

Oaks are also under threat from pests, pathogens, and animal browsing, all of which damage the vulnerable understory trees that replace older oaks. Powdery mildew is a particularly prominent example of a pathogen hampering oak regeneration. In affected pedunculate oaks, research shows that powdery mildew makes them more light-demanding, reducing their competitiveness with other tree species (this is known as the pathogen mildew hypothesis). Because fencing and other exclusion methods are cost-prohibitive, deer are also able to browse freely on many managed forests, which reduces oak competitiveness because they are a favored species of the herbivores.

Impact 
Oaks are a ubiquitous and often critical species in many American and European forests. Oak forests comprise 51% (78.5 million ha) of U.S. forestland. As such, they have high economic value and ecological importance. Many animals species prefer the composition and structure of oak forest types over others, and regional-scale declines in oak forest are shown to have deleterious impacts on animal populations.

References 

Wikipedia Student Program
Quercus
Forest management